Katrin Karisma (also Katrin Karisma-Krumm; born on 21 August 1947) is an Estonian actress, singer and politician. She was a member of XI Riigikogu.

Karisma born in Tallinn. She was married first to actor Peeter Jakobi and then to opera singer Hendrik Krumm. She has three children: a son Ivo Krumm and daughters Mari Krumm and actress Piret Krumm. Piret Krumm is from her relationship with actor and singer Tõnu Kilgas.

She has been a member of Estonian Reform Party.

References

Living people
1947 births
Estonian Reform Party politicians
Members of the Riigikogu, 2007–2011
Women members of the Riigikogu
Estonian film actresses
Estonian stage actresses
Estonian musical theatre actresses
Estonian television actresses
20th-century Estonian actresses
20th-century Estonian women singers
Estonian pop singers
21st-century Estonian women singers
Estonian Academy of Music and Theatre alumni
Actresses from Tallinn
Singers from Tallinn
21st-century Estonian women politicians